The 2020–21 Magyar Kupa (English: Hungarian Cup) is the 81st season of Hungary's annual knock-out cup football competition. The title holders were Honvéd by winning the 2020 Magyar Kupa Final.

Main Tournament

Round of 128
A total of 128 teams participated in the 6th round of the Magyar Kupa. The new entrants were 12 clubs from the 2020–21 Nemzeti Bajnokság I, 20 clubs from the 2020–21 Nemzeti Bajnokság II, and 48 from the 2020–21 Nemzeti Bajnokság III.

Round of 64

Round of 32

Round of 16

Quarter-finals

Semi-finals
On 10 March 2021, the draw took place.

Final

See also
 2020–21 Nemzeti Bajnokság I
 2020–21 Nemzeti Bajnokság II
 2020–21 Nemzeti Bajnokság III

References

External links
 Official site 
 soccerway.com

Cup
Hungary
Magyar Kupa seasons